Amédée de Beauplan (11 July 1790 – 24 December 1853) was a 19th-century French playwright, composer and painter. 

Much of his family (including his father), close to queen Marie Antoinette's entourage, was executed during the French Revolution.

He composed hit songs, including Le Pardon and Dormez, mes chères amours, and the famous Leçon de valse du petit François (1834) sung in cabarets for over a century (in particular by ), and two opéras comiques: L'Amazone, after Scribe, Delestre-Poirson and Mélesville (1830) and Le Mari au bal (1845). He also authored several vaudevilles, novels, fables and painted some pictures between 1833 and 1842.
 
He was Arthur de Beauplan's father (1823–1890), also a playwright.

Bibliography
 Joël-Marie Fauquet, "Beauplan, Amédée de", in Dictionnaire de la musique en France au XIXe siècle (Paris: Fayard, 2003), .

References

1790 births
1853 deaths
19th-century classical composers
19th-century French composers
19th-century French dramatists and playwrights
French opera composers
French Romantic composers